Falcuna melandeta is a butterfly in the family Lycaenidae. It is found in Gabon. The habitat consists of primary forests.

References

Butterflies described in 1893
Poritiinae
Butterflies of Africa